The Wonder Who? was a nom de disque of The Four Seasons for four single records released from 1965 to 1967.  It was one of a handful of "names" used by the group at that time, including Frankie Valli (as a "solo" artist even though the Four Seasons were present on the record) and The Valli Boys. Wonder Who? recordings generally feature the falsetto singing by Valli, but with a softer falsetto than on "typical" Four Seasons recordings.

Background

The Four Lovers
The Four Seasons evolved from The Four Lovers, which recorded under a variety of names between 1956 and 1960. Lead singer Valli had himself recorded under several pseudonyms as well, including Frankie Tyler and Frankie Valley. Songwriter/guitarist/keyboardist Bob Gaudio did the same (as Turner Disentri and as Alex Alda) after he joined the Four Lovers in 1959.

Aside from the first Four Lovers single, "You're the Apple of My Eye" in 1956, the group's (and Valli's) records failed to chart. In 1958, The Four Lovers obtained a three-year artist contract with producer Bob Crewe, which gave the group a steady stream of session work (Valli can be heard singing in the background of "Rock and Roll Is Here to Stay" by Danny and the Juniors) in addition to recording for Crewe's Peri Records.

Since the beginning of The Four Lovers, the group performed in clubs and lounges in New Jersey and offered songs in a variety of styles, from country and western to pop to doo wop to rockabilly to Broadway tunes, with a sprinkling of Italian love songs thrown in.

The Four Seasons hit factory
In 1960, The Four Lovers became The 4 Seasons (named after the bowling lane). The session work (and recording under various names) continued, but now with Valli, Gaudio, and Crewe trying to sell both Gaudio compositions and Four Seasons recordings, the group finally achieved national distribution under its own name for the first time in four years. While the first single failed to sell, the second one, "Sherry", started a string of successes for The Four Seasons.  From 1962 to 1966, it has been estimated that The Four Seasons had sold about 50 million records, more than any recording act except The Beatles.

In the midst of a royalty dispute with Vee-Jay Records in late 1963, the Four Seasons left the label for Philips. While Vee-Jay started recycling Four Seasons product in 1964, Phillips started releasing new Four Seasons records with increasing frequency as the British invasion began. With the blessing of Philips officials, Valli rekindled his "solo" career in the latter part of 1965, releasing records that were credited to him and having the group as backing musicians. In 1966 and 1967, Four Seasons records and Frankie Valli singles were listed on the Billboard Hot 100 chart, with both names appearing simultaneously in the chart in several issues of the magazine.

The Wonder Who? history and beyond
On the heels of recording a live album of Broadway tunes (to complete the settlement of the group's lawsuit with Vee-Jay), Valli, Crewe, and Gaudio had planned on recording an album consisting entirely of songs written by Bob Dylan, but as recording progressed, the concept was modified to include songs by Burt Bacharach and Hal David. Valli was not happy with his vocals on the various takes of "Don't Think Twice, It's All Right" when he decided to record the song with a "joke" falsetto vocal (an impression of jazz musician Rose Murphy) to reduce the tension in the studio.

An executive of Philips Records heard a replay of the recording with a "joke" vocal and wanted it to be released as a single — Two years earlier, Peter, Paul, and Mary had reached the #9 position on the Hot 100 with their version of the song — but the recording by Valli and the band could not be released as either a Valli "solo" single or a Four Seasons single. Sold in a picture sleeve with a connect the dots puzzle, the record with the truncated name ("Don't Think Twice") was released as by "The Wonder Who?" in November 1965. It reached No. 12 on the Hot 100, and as it was sliding down the chart in January 1966, a Frankie Valli "solo" single ("(You're Gonna) Hurt Yourself") and a Four Seasons single ("Working My Way Back to You") were also in the upper half of the chart, giving three simultaneous hit records by the group under different guises.

In the wake of "Don't Think Twice", Vee-Jay reissued a Four Seasons recording, "Peanuts" (originally a 1957 hit by Little Joe and the Thrillers), as by "The Wonder Who" (without the question mark). As was the case with previous Four Seasons releases of the song, the "Wonder Who" single didn't sell and didn't chart.

Two more "Wonder Who?" singles were released by Philips. Three of the four sides made it onto the lower reaches of the Hot 100.

"Don't Think Twice" and the other charting "Wonder Who?" recordings were included on Four Seasons albums, which, in their original releases, made no mention of the name that was created for single release.

While "Lonesome Road" became the last "Wonder Who?" single, the group continued to release both Four Seasons and Frankie Valli "solo" singles until 1975, when Valli had recorded "Swearin' to God" without any participation from the group (his previous hit, "My Eyes Adored You" was recorded as a Four Seasons recording, but was released as a "solo" record).

Members 

 Frankie Valli
 Tommy DeVito (died 2020)
 Bob Gaudio
 Nick Massi (died 2000)
 Joe Long (died 2021)

Singles by "The Wonder Who?"

All "Wonder Who?" singles were produced by Bob Crewe.

"Don't Think Twice"/"Sassy"

Philips 40324, released October 1965. "Don't Think Twice" was originally recorded by composer Bob Dylan (as "Don't Think Twice, It's All Right") on his 1963 album, The Freewheelin' Bob Dylan.  Peter, Paul, and Mary released the most commercially successful version of the song in September 1963. It reached No. 9 on the Hot 100 singles chart. The "Wonder Who?" version peaked at No. 12 in December 1965.

"Sassy" was an original instrumental by the Four Seasons. Composing credit was given to Bob Gaudio and Bob Crewe.

"On the Good Ship Lollipop"/"You're Nobody till Somebody Loves You"

Philips 40380, released June 1966. Composed by Richard A. Whiting and Sidney Clare, "On the Good Ship Lollipop" made its debut in the 1934 Shirley Temple motion picture Bright Eyes and is most identified with Temple singing it, but the most successful commercial release of the song was by Rudy Vallee,  reaching No. 4 on the Billboard chart in 1935. The Four Seasons/Wonder Who version barely made a dent on the Hot 100, reaching the #87 position.

"You're Nobody till Somebody Loves You" was another chestnut, having been a hit for Russ Morgan in 1946 and recorded by numerous artists since then. It was composed by Morgan, Larry Stock, and Harry Cavanaugh. When the version credited to "The Wonder Who?" appeared on the Hot 100 at the #96 position, it marked the only time that two positions were simultaneously occupied by the fictitious group, and only "Wonder Who?" single that had both sides chart.

"The Lonesome Road"/"Around and Around (andaroundandaroundandaroundandaround)"

Philips 40471, released July 1967. Composed by Gene Austin and Nathaniel Shilkret, "Lonesome Road" was first recorded by Austin, accompanied by Shilkret directing the Victor Orchestra, in 1927 and has since been recorded by over two hundred famous artists. It was used in five motion pictures, including  the motion picture Show Boat.  The version by "The Wonder Who?" reached No. 89 in its brief appearance on the Hot 100.

"Around and Around" was a Four Seasons original composed by Gaudio and Crewe. While it appeared on this single as a song by "The Wonder Who?", the same take later appeared on the B-side of the 1968 Four Seasons single "Will You Love Me Tomorrow" and credited to the group.

"Peanuts"/"My Sugar" (as The Wonder Who)

Vee-Jay 717, released March 1966. Composed by "Little Joe" Cook, "Peanuts" was originally a #22 hit for Little Joe and the Thrillers in 1957 (their only chart recording). In January 1963, Vee-Jay Records released a Four Seasons single with "Peanuts" as the A-side and "Stay" as the B-side. After various disk jockeys started playing "Stay" on the radio, Vee-Jay superseded the release, issuing new singles with "Stay" on the A-side and "Goodnight My Love" as the B-side. Several subsequent reissues with "Peanuts" as the A-side failed to sell or chart, including the one "credited" to "The Wonder Who" (without the question mark).

"My Sugar" is a Gaudio-Crewe composition that made its first appearance on the 1963 Four Seasons album Big Girls Don't Cry and Twelve Others. This marks the first release of this recording on a Four Seasons (or "Wonder Who") single.

See also
List of U.S. singles by Frankie Valli and The Four Seasons
The Four Seasons
Frankie Valli

References

Rock music groups from New Jersey
American pop rock music groups
Philips Records artists
Vee-Jay Records artists